The Call to Vengeance by Jude Watson is the sixteenth in a series of young reader novels called Jedi Apprentice. The series explores the adventures of Qui-Gon Jinn and Obi-Wan Kenobi prior to Star Wars: Episode I – The Phantom Menace.

Plot
Qui-Gon Jinn is nearing the dark side of the Force . He's looking for vengeance and he has left alone his Padawan, forgetting everything except vengeance. Now Obi-Wan Kenobi is afraid about his master and he asks for help from Jedi Master Mace Windu and his close friend, Bant.

However, Qui-Gon's leads are solid, and the Jedi have a difficult time keeping him at bay. Eventually, Qui-Gon pins down the leader of the rogue faction. Although his revenge is almost complete, Qui-Gon backs down when he sees his apprentice, Obi-Wan, staring at him passively. Qui-Gon lays down his grief and accepts the fact that the rebels on New Apsolon must be tried and brought to justice, not slaughtered.

Peace is temporarily restored to New Apsolon, but Qui-Gon is still bitter over the death of his loved one, Tahl.

External links
Amazon.com Listing
Official CargoBay Listing
TheForce.net review

2001 British novels
2001 science fiction novels
Star Wars: Jedi Apprentice
Star Wars Legends novels
English novels